Spheropistha is a genus of Asian comb-footed spiders that was first described by T. Yaginuma in 1957.

Species
 it contains seven species, found in Taiwan, Japan, and China:
Spheropistha huangsangensis (Yin, Peng & Bao, 2004) – China
Spheropistha melanosoma Yaginuma, 1957 (type) – Japan, Korea?
Spheropistha miyashitai (Tanikawa, 1998) – Japan
Spheropistha nigroris (Yoshida, Tso & Severinghaus, 2000) – Taiwan
Spheropistha orbita (Zhu, 1998) – China
Spheropistha rhomboides (Yin, Peng & Bao, 2004) – China
Spheropistha xinhua Barrion, Barrion-Dupo & Heong, 2013 – China

See also
 List of Theridiidae species

References

Further reading

Araneomorphae genera
Spiders of Asia
Theridiidae